Loree is an unincorporated community in Clay Township, Miami County, in the U.S. state of Indiana.

History
Loree was laid out in 1888 when the Pan Handle Railroad was extended to that point. The community was named in honor of a railroad employee. A post office was established at Loree in 1888, and remained in operation until 1926.

References

Unincorporated communities in Miami County, Indiana
Unincorporated communities in Indiana